Geri is a feminine given name and a shorter form (hypocorism) of the given name Geraldine.

People
Notable people with the name include:
Geri Allen (born 1957), American jazz pianist and music producer
Geri Çipi (born 1976), Albanian football defender
Geri Donnelly (born 1965), Canadian association football midfielder
Geri Doran (born 1966), American academic
Geri Evans (born 1940), American politician and teacher
Geri Hall (born 1972), Canadian actress and comedian 
Geri Halliwell (born 1972), English singer and songwriter, member of the Spice Girls
Geri Hoo (1939–2007), American actress 
Geri Huser (born 1963), American politician
Geri Jewell (born 1956), American actress 
Geri M. Joseph (born 1923), American journalist, academic and political figure 
Geri Larkin, American Buddhist 
Geri Malaj (born 1989), Albanian footballer 
Geri Mandagi (born 1988), Indonesian football  goalkeeper
Geri Maye, Irish presenter on radio and television
Geri McGee (1936–1982), American model and socialite
Geri Palast, Managing Director of the Israel Action Network 
Geri-Lynn Ramsay (born 1988), Canadian curler
Geri Reischl (born 1959), American actress and singer
Geri Lynch Tomich (born 1964), American synchronized figure skating coach
Geri Coleman Tucker, American journalist
Geri Ward, American artist
Geri Winkler (born 1956), Austrian mountaineer
Geri X (born 1989), Bulgarian-born singer-songwriter

Fictional characters
Geri, an old man character from the 1997 Disney/Pixar animated short film Geri's Game and the 1999 Disney/Pixar animated film Toy Story 2 as the Cleaner
Geri Evans (Family Affairs) from the British soap opera Family Affairs
Geri Hudson from the British Channel 4 soap opera, Hollyoaks